The 2020–21 Polish Cup was the 64th edition of the Polish Volleyball Cup tournament.

ZAKSA Kędzierzyn-Koźle beat Jastrzębski Węgiel in the final (3–0) and won its eighth Polish Cup.

Final four
 Venue: HWS Suche Stawy, Kraków 
 All times are Central European Time (UTC+01:00).

Semifinals
|}

Final

|}

Final standings

See also
 2020–21 PlusLiga

References

External links
 Official website

Polish Cup
Polish Cup
Polish Cup
Polish Cup